Dhoom Machaao Dhoom (English: Rock Let's Rock) is an Indian Musical television Sitcom aired on Disney Channel India
 that ran from 8 January 2007 to 10 January 2008 totaling 100 episodes. The story revolves around Priyanka Sethi and a band she forms with her three friends called the Pink Band. The show is one of the first Disney Channel India Original Series.

The show is notable for being the debut platform of many actors who later went to have a successful acting careers on television; Sriti Jha, Kinshuk Mahajan, Toral Rasputra, Maanvi Gagroo, Vikrant Massey and Jay Bhanushali.

Plot
Priyanka Sethi returns to Delhi from New York with her mother after her parents divorce and has trouble adjusting to her new school. Priyanka, who sings, composes and plays guitar, often spends time in her school's music room, where she befriends three unlikely people: Malini, who plays keyboards secretly due to her conservative father's opposition to music; Bikki, an extrovert Punjabi girl who plays tambourine; and Kajal, a hot-headed rebellious girl who plays drums. The four of them create a band of their own, called Pink Band and try to break stereotypes regarding music, bands and societal norms, and soon become celebrities popular with other girls.

The queen bee of the school, Koel, is jealous of them and frequently attempts to sabotage the band. Despite all odds, the band sticks together, and the story shows how they achieve international fame with their will and music.

Cast
 Toral Rasputra as Priyanka Sethi
 Sriti Jha as Malini "Malu" Sharma
 Maanvi Gagroo as Ambika "Bikki" Gill
 Aanchal Bharti as Kajal "KJ" Jain
 Niddhi Tikoo as Koel Tolani
 Aanchal Munjal as Sameera
 Kinshuk Mahajan as Adiraj "Addy" Sherawat
 Akshay Sethi as Nihal Singh Rathore
 Vikrant Massey as Aamir Hassan
 Jay Bhanushali as Varun Bhaskar
 Nirav Soni as Sameer "Motu" Motwani
 Danesh Irani as Cyrus "Psycho" Kachwalla
 Swati Bajpai as Madhu, elder sister of Malini
 Nazneen Madan as Shenaz Ma'am 
 Sujata Sehgal as Lekha Ma'am  
 Neha Saroopa as Tanya 
 Pooja Saroopa as Sanya 
 Vikrant Siraj as Anmol Jain
 Paritosh Sand as Brijbhushan Sharma
 Meher Acharia as Priyanka's Mom  
 Bhakti Rathod as Loveleen
 Bhuvnesh Shetty as yoga teacher Kreepy (credited as Bhuvanesh Shetty)
 Neelima Parandekar as Malini's mother
 Natasha Sinha as Parvati Menon aka PM, teacher of Heritage High and also mother of Nihaal which was revealed later
 Bikramjeet Kanwarpal as Koel's father

See also
Disney Channel India Original Series
List of programmes broadcast by Disney Channel (India)

References

2007 Indian television series debuts
2008 Indian television series endings
Indian musical television series
Indian teen drama television series
Indian children's television series
Disney Channel (Indian TV channel) original programming
Television shows set in Delhi